London Buses route 453 is a Transport for London contracted bus route in London, England. Running between Deptford Bridge and Marylebone stations, it is operated by London Central.

History

Route 453 commenced operating on 15 March 2003 as part of a reorganisation of routes in preparation for the introduction of the London congestion charge. Operating between Deptford Bridge and Marylebone stations, it parallels  route 53 as far as Lambeth North station. It was initially operated by Stagecoach London's Plumstead garage with Mercedes-Benz O530G articulated buses. Night route N453 was introduced at the same time.

Route 453 originally started from the first busy single stop on route 53, at Deptford, outside Addey and Stanhope School, then duplicated the 53 via New Cross, New Cross Gate, Old Kent Road, Bricklayers Arms, Elephant & Castle, St George's Circus, Westminster, to Whitehall, then Regent Street, Oxford Street, Great Portland Street, Regent's Park and to Marylebone station. The section north of Oxford Circus was a new service designed to create a new south–west link at Regent's Park station.

New Routemasters were introduced on 18 October 2014. The rear platform remains closed at all times except for when the bus is at bus stops. On 29 July 2017, the route transferred to London Central operating from their New Cross (NX) garage as the Mandela Way (MW) garage closed.

Current route
Route 453 operates via these primary locations:
Deptford Bridge station 
New Cross station  
New Cross Gate station  
Old Kent Road
Peckham
Old Kent Road
Bricklayers Arms
Elephant & Castle
Elephant & Castle station  
St George's Circus
Lambeth North station 
St Thomas' Hospital
Westminster station 
Trafalgar Square
Haymarket / St James's
Piccadilly Circus
Regent Street
Oxford Circus
Great Portland street station 
Regent's Park station 
Harley Street
Baker Street station 
Marylebone station

References

External links

Timetable

Bus routes in London
Transport in the Royal Borough of Greenwich
Transport in the London Borough of Lewisham
Transport in the London Borough of Southwark
Transport in the City of Westminster